"A Thing About Machines" is episode 40 of the American television anthology series The Twilight Zone. It originally aired on October 28, 1960, on CBS.

Opening narration

Plot
Lonely, ill-tempered gourmet magazine critic and misanthrope Bartlett Finchley berates a repairman after the latter fixes his television and tells him to stop abusing his appliances over mild inconveniences. Believing the machines are conspiring against him, however, Finchley continues to do so. Fed up with his paranoid behavior, his secretary quits. Following this, his typewriter types out the message "GET OUT OF HERE FINCHLEY" repeatedly on its own and the TV displays a program with a woman saying the same message. While trying to shave, his electric shaver rises and lunges at him before his telephone repeats the typewriter and TV's message despite Finchley ripping the telephone out of the wall earlier.

Finchley hears a siren outside and goes to investigate, finding that his car rolled down the driveway and nearly hit a child. After rudely dismissing the attending police officer and neighbors, Finchley returns to his house, drinks, and passes out. When he awakens, the machines repeatedly tell him to leave while his razor slithers downstairs after him. He runs outside, only to be chased by his car until he ends up drowning in the pool and sinking to the bottom. After the police pull him out, neither they nor the ambulance personnel can explain how he sank without being weighted, and theorize he may have had a heart attack.

Closing narration

Cast
Richard Haydn as Bartlett Finchley
Barbara Stuart as Edith Rogers
Barney Phillips as TV repairman
Jay Overholts as Intern
Henry Beckman as Policeman
Margarita Cordova as Girl on TV

See also
 List of The Twilight Zone (1959 TV series) episodes

References
 DeVoe, Bill. (2008). Trivia from The Twilight Zone. Albany, GA: Bear Manor Media. 
 Grams, Martin. (2008). The Twilight Zone: Unlocking the Door to a Television Classic. Churchville, MD: OTR Publishing.

External links
 

1960 American television episodes
The Twilight Zone (1959 TV series season 2) episodes
Television episodes written by Rod Serling
Technophobia
Television episodes about technology